Sunil Subramaniam (born 28 May 1967) is a former Indian first-class cricketer and the current head coach of the Tamil Nadu Cricket Association Academy and manager of the Indian national team. During his playing career, Subramaniam represented Tamil Nadu cricket team and Assam cricket team. He took up the job of cricket coaching in 2005.

Career
Subramaniam is a former slow left-arm orthodox spinner who played for Tamil Nadu cricket team for ten seasons from 1988/89 to 1997/98 before getting dropped from the team. He then played one season for Assam cricket team in 2000/01. Despite having a successful first-class career, he was never considered for India selection. He appeared for Rest of India in 1994/95 Irani Trophy against Mumbai.

During his playing career, Subramaniam also worked for the Indian IT company HCL Technologies.

Subramaniam retired from competitive cricket in 2001 at the age of 34. He made the retirement call after tearing a ligament in his left leg during practice following which he underwent two operations. He had two simultaneous injuries at the time of retirement, with blades inserted into both his legs. He was regarded to be among "the most feared bowlers in first class cricket" for his bowling skills and aggressive approach.

In 2005, he became the coach of the Tamil Nadu Cricket Association Academy. He has been the coach of Indian spinner Ravichandran Ashwin since Ashwin's under-19 days at Tamil Nadu.

References

External links 
 
 

1967 births
Living people
Indian cricketers
Tamil Nadu cricketers
Assam cricketers
Indian cricket coaches